Marlborough Village Historic District is a national historic district located in East Marlborough Township and Newlin Township, Chester County, Pennsylvania. It encompasses 21 contributing buildings and 2 contributing site in the crossroads community of Marlborough Village. It includes the Marlborough Meeting House, Schoolmaster's House (1829), General Store (1834) and residence, former brick schoolhouse (1901), a small farm, a row of five houses built between 1840 and 1855, a Sears House bungalow known as the Brown House (1927), another pattern house known as the Larkin House (1938), and the Bernard / Wickersham farmhouse (1726, 1771) and barn (c. 1767).

It was added to the National Register of Historic Places in 1995.

References

External links 
 Map of Marlborough Village 

Historic districts on the National Register of Historic Places in Pennsylvania
Historic districts in Chester County, Pennsylvania
National Register of Historic Places in Chester County, Pennsylvania
Greek Revival houses in Pennsylvania
American Craftsman architecture in Pennsylvania
Bungalow architecture in the United States
Kit houses
Bungalow architecture in Pennsylvania